Bavanat may refer to:
 Bavanat, former name of Surian, a city in Iran
Bavanat County, an administrative subdivision of Iran